Francis Aungier, 1st Earl of Longford PC (Ire) (ca. 163223 December 1700) was an English politician, who sat in the House of Commons from 1660 to 1679. He was an administrator in Ireland.

Aungier was the son of Ambrose Aungier, chancellor of St Patrick's Cathedral, Dublin, and his wife Grizzell Bulkeley, daughter of Lancelot Bulkeley, Archbishop of Dublin. The Aungier family originated from Cambridgeshire, but his grandfather was appointed Master of the Rolls in Ireland. Aungier inherited the Barony on the death of his uncle, Gerald Aungier, 2nd Baron Aungier of Longford, in 1655.

Aungier inherited some property in Surrey, and in 1660, he was elected Member of Parliament for Surrey in the Convention Parliament. In 1661 he was appointed governor of Westmeath and Longford. He was elected MP for Arundel in 1661 and sat until 1679. He was created Viscount Longford in the Peerage of Ireland in 1675 and Earl of Longford in 1677. In 1689 Longford was one of the few Irish Protestant peers to participate in the Irish Parliament called by James II, but he later became reconciled to William of Orange.
 
Aungier married firstly Jane Carr, daughter of Sir Edward Carr of Hillingdon and secondly Anne daughter of Arthur Chichester, 1st Earl of Donegall and widow of John Butler, 1st Earl of Gowran. He had no children and was succeeded by special remainder in his titles by his brother Ambrose.

References

|-

1632 births
1700 deaths
17th-century Irish people
Politicians from County Longford
Irish people of English descent
Members of the Irish House of Lords
Members of the Privy Council of Ireland
English MPs 1659
English MPs 1660
English MPs 1661–1679
1